For All - O Trampolim da Vitória (English: For All: Springboard to Victory) is a 1997 Brazilian comedy-drama film directed by Buza Ferraz and Luiz Carlos Lacerda.

Largely praised by critics, he received the awards for best film, best script, best soundtrack, best art direction and best jury film at the 25th Gramado Film Festival, and best film, best actor and best art direction at the Brazilian Film Festival of Miami. It was also the last credited role of actor Alexandre Lippiani, who died in a traffic collision on May 24, 1997.

Cast 
Betty Faria... Lindalva Sandrini
José Wilker ... Giancarlo Sandrini
Paulo Gorgulho... João Marreco
Caio Junqueira... Miguel Sandrini
Erik Svane... Sargento Frank Donovan
Alexandre Lippiani.... Capitão
Luiz Carlos Tourinho....Sandoval
Flávia Bonato....Iracema
Daniela Duarte.... Jucilene
Alexandre Barros... Tenente Robert Collins
Claudia Netto.... Jay Francis
Cláudio Mamberti.... Sr. Bola
Edson Celulari... Wolfgang Stössel
Marcélia Cartaxo.... Miloca
Cláudia Mauro.... Bernadete
Catarina Abdala... Clotilde

References

External links
 For All - O Trampolim da Vitória at IMDb

1997 comedy-drama films
1997 films
Brazilian comedy-drama films
1990s Portuguese-language films
Films set in Natal, Rio Grande do Norte